Qarah Bagh (also Romanized as Qarah Bāgh and Qareh Bāgh; also known as Qarābāq) is a village in Taghenkoh-e Shomali Rural District, Taghenkoh District, Firuzeh County, Razavi Khorasan Province, Iran. At the 2006 census, its population was 747, in 205 families.

References 

Populated places in Firuzeh County